This is a list of records and statistics of the OFC Nations Cup.

Debut of national teams

Overall team records
In this ranking 3 points are awarded for a win, 1 for a draw and 0 for a loss. As per statistical convention in football, matches decided in extra time are counted as wins and losses, while matches decided by penalty shoot-outs are counted as draws. Teams are ranked by total points, then by goal difference, then by goals scored.

Medal table

Comprehensive team results by tournament 
Legend
 – Champions
 – Runners-up
 – Third place
 – Fourth place
 – Semi-finals (in years without a 3rd/4th play-off)
5th — Fifth place
6th — Sixth place
GS – Group stage
 — Qualified for an upcoming tournament
 — Qualified but withdrew
 — Did not qualify
 — Did not enter / Withdrew / Banned
 — Hosts

For each tournament, the number of teams in each finals tournament (in brackets) are shown.

General statistics by tournament

Team: tournament position

All-time

 Most championships
 5,  (1973, 1998, 2002, 2008, 2016)

 Most finishes in the top two
 6,  (1980, 1996, 1998, 2000, 2002, 2004)
 6,  (1973, 1998, 2000, 2002, 2008, 2016)

 Most finishes in the top four
 9,  (1973, 1996, 1998, 2000, 2002, 2004, 2008, 2012, 2016)

 Most second place finishers
 3,  (1973, 1980, 1996)

Consecutive

 Most consecutive championships
 2,  (1980, 1996)

 Most consecutive finishes in the top two
 6,  (1980, 1996, 1998, 2000, 2002, 2004)

 Most consecutives finishes in the top four
 7,  (1998, 2000, 2002, 2004, 2008, 2012, 2016)

Gaps
 Longest gap between successive titles
 25 years,  (1973–1998)

 Longest gap between successive appearances in the top two
 16 years,  (1996–2012)

 Longest gap between successive appearances in the top four
 12 years,  (1996–2008)

Host team
 Best finish by host team
 Champions,  (1973, 2002),  (2004)

Debuting teams
 Best finish by a debuting team
 Champions,  (1973),  (1980)

Other
 Most finishes in the top two without ever being champion
 2,  (2008, 2012)

 Most finishes in the top four without ever being champion
 5,  (1996, 2000, 2004, 2012, 2016)

 Most finishes in the top four without ever finishing in the top two
 4,  (1973, 2000, 2002, 2008)

Team: tournament progression

All-time
 Progressed from the group stage the most times
 9,  (1973, 1996, 1998, 2000, 2002, 2004, 2008, 2012, 2016)

 Eliminated in the group stage the most times
 4,  (1980, 1998, 2012, 2016)

 Most appearances, never progressed from the group stage
 2,  (1998, 2000),  (2012, 2016)

Consecutive
 Most consecutive progressions from the group stage
 8,  (1996, 1998, 2000, 2002, 2004, 2008, 2012, 2016)

 Most consecutive eliminations from the group stage
 2,  (1998, 2000),  (2012, 2016)

Team: Matches played/goals scored

All-time

 Most matches played
 44, 

 Most wins
 32, 

 Most losses
 26, 

 Most draws
 5, 

 Most matches played without a win
 6, 

 Most goals scored
 142, 

 Most goals conceded
 85, 

 Fewest goals scored
 1, 

 Fewest goals conceded
 13, 

 Most meetings between two teams, final match
 3 times,  vs.  (1998, 2000, 2002, 2004)

Total hosts

Performances by host nations

Performances by defending champions

Teams yet to qualify for finals

The following five teams which are current OFC members have never qualified for the Nations Cup.

Legend
 – Did not qualify
 – Did not enter / Withdrew / Banned

For each tournament, the number of teams in each finals tournament (in brackets) are shown.

Overall top goalscorers

Hat-tricks

A hat-trick is achieved when the same player scores three or more goals in one match. Listed in chronological order.

References

External links
 Oceania Nations Cup on RSSSF archive
 OFC official website

OFC Nations Cup
International association football competition records and statistics